A sector light is a man-made pilotage and position fixing aid that consists of strictly delineated horizontal angle light beams to guide water-borne traffic through a safe channel at night in reasonable visibility. Sector lights are most often used for safe passage through shallow or dangerous waters. This may be when leaving or entering harbour. Nautical charts (paper and electronic) give all the required information.

Sectors of colored glass (or plastic) are placed in the lanterns of these lights. The light will then show these colors when observed certain bearings. Bearings referring to a sector are given in degrees true, as observed from sea. Though the colors of the light will change, the characteristics will not. The change of color is not abrupt. The transition is made through an arc of uncertainty of 2° or greater.

The colors that are used, are conform to the IALA Maritime Buoyage system that is designed by the International Association of Lighthouse Authorities:
 white - this sector is in the middle of the safe channel
 red - indicates the port edge of the channel for vessels approaching the light source
 green - indicates the starboard edge of the channel for vessels approaching the light source.
A ship that is sailing in safe water and then sees the red (or green) color of the light has to make an alteration in course.

The world has different navigation standards managed by IALA (International Association of Lighthouse Authorities). For example, the United States uses a signalling standard which is the opposite of Europe. In USA, the red light indicates the starboard side of the channel for harbour bound vessels, while the green light indicates the port side of the same channel. An expression to remind of this is "red on right returning".

Examples of sector lights 

An example of a sector light is the light of the Fisgard Lighthouse in British Columbia. The lighthouse was built to guide ships through the entrance of Esquimalt harbour. The white sector is an isophase light of 2s from 322° to 195°. If the ship sees this white light, it can pass safely. The rest shows a red light from 195 to 322°. If a vessel sees this light, it should alter its course.

Another example is the PEL sector light at Diego Garcia. The PEL sector light was constructed to guide US Navy vessels into the Diego Garcia port through a narrow entrance in the lagoon. The PEL sector light produces 3.5 million candela and is visible for 10 nautical miles (18.5 km) by day. The beam with 3 colors is narrow at 1.6°. This was required because the PEL sector light was built over 7NM (13 km) from the atoll entrance and it had to illuminate a safe entrance which is only 228 meters wide.

A more complex example is Kolnesholmane, on the southern approach to Risavika in SW Norway. This has multiple white green and red sectors, indicating safe passage from several directions.

References

Lighthouses
Maritime signalling
Navigation